Lock and Dam No. 17 is a lock and dam located near New Boston, Illinois on the Upper Mississippi River near river mile 437. In 2004, the facility was listed in the National Register of Historic Places as Lock and Dam No. 17 Historic District, #04000177 covering , 1 building, 3 structures and 2 objects.

See also
 Public Works Administration dams list

References

External links

Lock and Dam No. 17 - U.S. Army Corps of Engineers

Lock 17

Buildings and structures in Louisa County, Iowa
Buildings and structures in Mercer County, Illinois
Dams completed in 1939
Dams in Iowa
Dams on the Mississippi River
17
17
Gravity dams
Historic American Engineering Record in Illinois
Historic American Engineering Record in Iowa
Historic districts on the National Register of Historic Places in Illinois
17
Mississippi River locks
Moderne architecture in Illinois
Moderne architecture in Iowa
Roller dams
Transport infrastructure completed in 1939
Mississippi Valley Division
National Register of Historic Places in Mercer County, Illinois
National Register of Historic Places in Louisa County, Iowa
17
1939 establishments in Illinois
1939 establishments in Iowa